Glyphipterix fuscoviridella is a moth of the  family Glyphipterigidae. It is found in Great Britain, Belgium, France, Portugal, Spain, Switzerland, Italy, Serbia and Montenegro and Bulgaria.

The wingspan is 10–16 mm. Adults are on wing from May to June.

The larvae feed on Luzula campestris. They mostly bore the stem of their host plant, but may also mine the base of a leaf. Pupation takes place between the roots of the host plant. The larvae have a pale rose pink body and a shining amber head. They can be found in March and April.

References

Moths described in 1828
Glyphipterigidae
Moths of Europe